Cannonsburg can refer to a place in the United States:

Cannonsburg, Kentucky
Cannonsburg, Michigan
Cannonsburg, Ohio

See also
Canonsburg, Pennsylvania